The Adventures of Hatim is an Indian fantasy television series which was premiered on 28 December 2013. The story revolves around Hatim, the Prince of Yemen, who went on a journey to solve the 7 riddles in order to destroy the evil sorcerer Zargam.  It aired on Life OK on Saturday and Sunday evenings. It was the remake of Star Plus show Hatim, The series stars Rajbeer Singh and Pooja Banerjee.

Cast
 Rajbeer Singh as Hatim Tai
 Pooja Banerjee as Perizaad
 Krishna Singh Bisht as Qasim
 Chandan K Anand as General Zargam of Arzaan
 Ashish Dixit as Jangal ka Shikari Veerbhadra.
 Manoj Kolhatkar as Lakha the hunchback
 Dolly Sohi as Queen Shazia of Yaman
 Pracheen Chauhan as Prince Hassan of Yaman
 Nausheen Ali Sardar as Queen Ruda
 Sachin Tyagi as King Hubal
 Anjali Abrol as Queen Khwaish of Ashkaar
 Riyanka Chanda as Naaz Pari
 Khalid Siddiqui as King Naushwerwaan of Ashkaar
 Ali Hassan as Khabees
 Narayani Shastri as Neena 
 Kishwer Merchant as vampiress Zelna
 Reena Aggarwal as Safina
 Anang Desai as King Nomaad of Ishtiyaar
 Anil Rastogi as prisoner in Forest of Death
 Jay Thakkar as Rakhban
 Devesh Ahuja as Prince Rustom
 Kamya Panjabi as Chudail Rihana
 Akanksha Juneja as Princess Gull
 Kalyani Badeka as Maya
 Ananya Agarwal as Princess
 Deepali Muchrikar as Witch Haseena
 Neena Cheema as Witch Afsana
 Pooran Kiri as Jurgaal 
 Akhil Mishra as Amaan's father 
 Amit Behl as Surebo
 Jasvir Kaur as Mundra
 Jiten Lalwani as Bilmus
 Manish Khanna as Shaitan Groban
 Sara Khan as Roshni
 Nigaar Khan as Witch Mallika
 Rajesh Khera as Akaa

References

External links

 on hotstar

Indian fantasy television series
Indian drama television series
2013 Indian television series debuts
2014 Indian television series endings
Life OK original programming
Works based on One Thousand and One Nights
Indian epic television series